Tammy Ann Jansen (born ) is a beauty queen from the Seattle suburbs who represented the state of Washington in the Miss USA pageant.

Jansen won the Miss Washington USA Pageant in June 1998, and later represented Washington in the Miss USA 1999 pageant in Branson, Missouri. She did not make the semifinals at the nationally televised pageant, which was won by Kimberly Pressler of New York.

After her reign, Jansen competed on the TV show "Destination Stardom...from Hawaii". 

Jansen is a native of Wisconsin, where she grew up in a farming community, but later moved to Washington. She has worked as an aesthetician.

Most of Jansen's life has included charity work. Areas of charity include Children's Hospital, Aids Research, Fred Hutchinson Cancer Research, American Heart Walk, Seasons of Life (Breast Cancer Research) and more.

References

External links
Washington USA official website
USA official website

1970s births
American beauty pageant winners
Living people
Miss USA 1999 delegates
Miss Washington USA winners
People from Wisconsin